"'Lady Luck/Dilly Dally" is the fourth Japanese single from South Korean girl group After School. It is a double A-side single consisting of two a-sides and one b-side, the b-side being exclusive to the CD only edition. The single was scheduled to be released on June 13, 2012. "Dilly Dally" was sampled on the Rexena deodorant commercial and "Lady Luck" was used in Samantha Thavasa's "summer collection" commercial. The b-side, "Slow Love", was also used on a commercial for Eyefull Home. The single is to be released in three versions: CD only edition, CD & DVD (Type A) edition and CD & DVD (Type B) edition.

This is the last release with former leader Park Kahi.

Track listing

Chart performance

Oricon chart

Release history

References

2012 singles
After School (band) songs
Avex Trax singles
Hybe Corporation singles